Biokhimiya is a Russian peer-reviewed scientific journal of biochemistry published by Nauka/Interperiodica. The journal was established by the  Academy of Sciences of the USSR (now Russian Academy of Sciences) and the Russian Biochemical Society in 1936. The English translation Biochemistry (Moscow) has been published since 1956. Until his death in February 2023 it was edited by Vladimir P. Skulachev.

Abstracting and indexing
Biokhimiya or its English translation are abstracted and indexed in the following databases.

External links
Biokhimiya website
Biochemistry (Moscow) description

Biochemistry journals
Publications established in 1936
Nauka academic journals
Russian-language journals
English-language journals
1936 establishments in the Soviet Union